Hemipneustidae is an extinct  family of sea urchins.

Genera
 Hemipneustes L. Agassiz, 1835 †
 Medjesia Jeffery, 1997 †
 Opisopneustes Gauthier, 1889 †
 Plesiohemipneustes Smith & Wright, 2003 †
 Toxopatagus Pomel, 1883 †

References

Holasteroida